The 2015 Shenzhen Open (known as 2015 Shenzhen Gemdale Open for sponsorship reason) was a tennis tournament played on outdoor hard courts. It was the third edition of the Shenzhen Open, and part of the WTA International tournaments of the 2015 WTA Tour. It took place at the Shenzhen Longgang Sports Center in Shenzhen, China, from 4 to 10 January 2015.

Points and prize money

Point distribution

Prize money

1 Qualifiers prize money is also the Round of 32 prize money
* per team

Singles main-draw entrants

Seeds

1 Rankings as of January 5, 2015.

Other entrants
The following players received wildcards into the singles main draw:
  Duan Yingying
  Natalia Vikhlyantseva

The following players received entry from the qualifying draw:
  Çağla Büyükakçay
  Olga Govortsova
  Aleksandra Krunić
  Zhu Lin

Withdrawals
Before the tournament
  Sorana Cîrstea (shoulder injury) → replaced by  Tímea Babos

Retirements
  Vera Zvonareva (lower back injury)

Doubles main-draw entrants

Seeds

1 Rankings as of December 29, 2014

Withdrawals
During the tournament
  Vera Zvonareva (lower back injury)

Champions

Singles

  Simona Halep def.  Timea Bacsinszky, 6–2, 6–2

Doubles

  Lyudmyla Kichenok /  Nadiia Kichenok def.  Liang Chen /  Wang Yafan, 6–4, 7–6(8–6)

References

External links
Official website 

WTA Shenzhen Open
WTA Shenzhen Open
2015